Tatyr-Uzyak (Tatır-Üźäk) is a rural locality (a selo) and the administrative center of Tatyr-Uzyaksky Selsoviet, Khaybullinsky District, Bashkortostan, Russia. The population was 1,146 as of 2010. There are 11 streets.

Geography 
Tatyr-Uzyak is located 15 km north of Akyar (the district's administrative centre) by road. Buribay is the nearest rural locality.

References 

Rural localities in Khaybullinsky District